The Pennsylvania Railroad's class B6 was its most successful class of switcher, or as the PRR termed them "shifter". The PRR preferred the 0-6-0 wheel arrangement for larger switchers, whereas on other railroads the 0-8-0 gained preference. The PRR generally used 2-8-0s when larger power was required.

History 
Altoona Works constructed the prototype B6 in 1902. The B6 had the Pennsylvania's trademark square-shouldered Belpaire firebox and  drivers. They were constructed as saturated steam engines, rebuilt with superheaters later as class B6s, and had Piston valves and Stephenson valve gear. A total of 79 were built by Baldwin and Lima, in addition to Altoona, between 1902 and 1913.

The next version built was the B6sa, 55 of which were built at Altoona during 1913–1914. These had radial-stay fireboxes, common elsewhere but rare on the Pennsylvania, and they replaced the Stephenson gear with the more modern Walschaerts valve gear. Steam delivery pipes were outside, like all other PRR modern power. All were built superheated.

Finally, during 1916–1920, 238 of class B6sb were built. These were the final, definitive type, and had a Belpaire firebox, but were otherwise little changed from the B6sa. The final 97 locomotives had piston valves mounted outboard of the cylinders, instead of inbound as previously built, giving the cylinder assemblies an outward cant at the top, rather than inward.

All B6sa and B6sb locomotives were retrofitted with power reverse to make the frequent back-and-forth of switching quicker and easier.

The last PRR locomotive in active service was #5244, leased to Union Transportation of New Egypt, New Jersey until July 1959. This was considered quite an achievement considering the Pennsylvania Railroad's extensive steam program.

In 1939, toy train manufacturer Lionel introduced their version of Pennsy's B6 in several variations including a scale version (scale couplers and smaller flanges to operate on special track) along with six versions of what would later become known as "semi-scale."

Two B6 survive:

- B6sb #1670 was saved in the PRR's historic collection at Northumberland, Pennsylvania and was donated to the Railroad Museum of Pennsylvania along with the majority of that collection.

- B6sa #60 is on a siding in Hockessin, Delaware, along the Wilmington and Western Railroad. It has a larger tender, from a 2-8-0 Consolidation, but it is intact, albeit in poor condition. In 2019–2020, it was donated to the Historic Red Clay Valley Inc., and the locomotive remains on a siding near Mt. Cuba.

Notes

References

External links 
 
 

Steam locomotives of the United States
Baldwin locomotives
Lima locomotives
0-6-0 locomotives
B6
Railway locomotives introduced in 1902
Standard gauge locomotives of the United States
Shunting locomotives